Anno Domini are an Australian symphonic black, death metal band. Formed in 2005, the band's line-up as from 2016 was Michael Aldeguer on guitars, Amir Bukan on drums and keyboards, Dan Kendall on bass guitar, Danny Straughen on guitars and Andy Suppradit on vocals.

The band's debut extended play, Original, came out in 2007 and there was another EP, The Downfall in 2012. They toured widely in 2011. In 2010 they released their debut album, Atrocities, and in 2016 followed with The Cold Expanse.

Reception

Metal Obsessions Mitch Booth observed that on Atrocities, "drums power along with a mechanical intensity, and the guitars gallop with melodic leads sneaking in here and there to give a few seconds rest. [Helmore]'s deep, smooth growl is huge and the power really kicks up a notch when he comes in. And hiding in the background are some simple, yet brilliantly used synths. They're subtle, never taking over." Peter Zaluzny of Loud Mag felt that they, "showcased their ability to seamlessly blend death metal and orchestral elements into hugely epic arrangements that were never over the top or cheesy." He noticed that their EP, The Downfall, "while taking a slightly different approach to their song writing in order to develop a more refined sound. It's a bold move by the band, and for the most part it works."

Reviewers of the relevant category of music praised the 2016 album. A reviewer, writing as "Robert in Death" on The Sonic Sensory, wrote  on 20 June 2016 of The Cold Expanse:
"... this five-piece bring together the better aspects of melodic death metal and somehow make it their own."
He called Anno Domini a "quality band" and went on: "A symphonic introduction leads an hour-plus affair of building musicianship, harrowing atmospherics and a controlled sense of instrumentation."

Band members

Current members
 Amir Bukan – Drums (2005–present), Keyboards, Programming (2008–present)
 Dan Kendall – Bass (2005–present)
 Danny Straughen – Guitars (2005–present)
 Andy Suppradit – Vocals (2016–present)

Former members
 Michael Aldeguer – Guitars (2016–2019)
 Iain McLure – Guitars (2005–2012)
 Kieran Helmore – Keyboards (2007), Vocals (2005–2012)
 Miles Readman – Vocals (2007)

Discography

Studio albums
 Atrocities (2010)
 The Cold Expanse (2016)

Extended plays
 Original (2007)
 The Downfall EP (2012)

Demos
 Promo 2008 (2008)

References

External links
 Anno Domini home page at Encyclopaedia Metallum
 RockBox page for The Cold Expanse
 Anno Domini channel home page on YouTube
 Anno Domini page on Facebook

Australian black metal musical groups
Australian death metal musical groups
Musical groups established in 2007